Celso Riva (born c. 1974) is an Italian independent video game designer of several critically acclaimed games, including The Goalkeeper, Universal Boxing Manager, Magic Stones, the Heileen and Vera Blanc series, Bionic Heart, and the Loren the Amazon Princess.

Life and game design career
At the age of twenty, Riva began his career, designing small-scale games for the Italian market. He took a seven-year sabbatical until 2003, when he discovered the shareware distribution model and created the sports management video game Universal Soccer Manager using BlitzBasic.

He moved to C/C++ language and published 10 more games under the Winter Wolves label, then opened a new company, Tycoon Games, on which he has published 6 games: the space war game Supernova 2: Spacewar, the dating sim game Summer Session, the visual novels Heileen and Bionic Heart, College Romance: Rise Of The Little Brother, and Spirited Heart. For the games Summer Session and Heileen, he moved away from C/C++ to embrace Python programming language and in particular the tool Ren'Py.

The stories of The Flower Shop: Summer In Fairbrook and The Flower Shop: Winter in Fairbrook were written by Ayu Sakata from sakevisual. Starting from 2020, some of his games were ported and published to consoles by Ratalaika Games.

Awards
In 2004, both his games The Goalkeeper and Universal Boxing Manager were nominated among the 5 top Sports Games of the Year  by the online magazine Gametunnel. In the 2011 Best Ofs from VNs Now!, Winter Wolves was named "Studio/EVN Circle of the Year".

Games

References

Interviews
In The Company of Wolves: Celso Riva Interview from rockpapershotgun.com
Interview from gamesetwatch.com
Interview from pig-min
Interview from Indie Superstar

External links
Winter Wolves computer games site
games forum
his personal blog
the games videos on YouTube

Video game programmers
Living people
1974 births